Arabic rice or rice with vermicelli (in Classical Arabic: ٱلْأَرُزُّ بِٱلشُّعَيْرِيَّةِ; Al-Aruzz bi-sh-shu'ayriyyat, in Lebanese Arabic: Rizz bi-sh-shʿayriyyeh "rice with vermicelli"; in Turkish, şehriyeli pirinç pilavı) is a traditional preparation of rice in the Middle East, a variant of the simpler cooked rice recipe, but adding lightly toasted vermicelli (tiny noodles). The rice cooking method is known as pilaf, by which the rice is fluffy, light and does not stick. Traditionally, a long-grain rice, such as basmati or jasmine, is used, although short-grain rice, such as bomba or misri ("Egyptian"), can be used perfectly. Brown rice can also be used.

The vermicelli used is the finest variety of noodles, called şehriye in Turkey, or shariyah (شعرية) in Arab countries, pastina or cappellini in Italy, and cabello de angel in Spain. They are a finer variety than spaghetti. As a fat agent, clarified butter is usually used, called in Arabic samneh (سمنة), better known internationally as ghee. Failing that, ordinary butter or olive oil can be used. A multitude of ingredients of all kinds can be added to the basic recipe, depending on each region, and even on each home: raisins and pine nuts,​ garlic​ or onion, almonds, etc.

Arab immigration to the Americas brought this way of making rice to this area, where today it is common in some regions, especially during Christmas. In Hispanic America, the arroz árabe or arroz con fideos is popular in the traditional cuisine of Colombia, Dominican Republic, the Peru and Chile.

Terminology and distribution 

In the Arab world there is no specific way to name this way of preparing rice, as it is the basic way of preparing rice. Rice, and more specifically rice with vermicelli, is a staple that accompanies most meals in the Middle East. This does not apply to the Maghreb. There is a common confusion of thinking that, being Arab countries, they also consume Arab rice. However, in North Africa the staple carbohydrate is wheat semolina called couscous. Rice is known but not common. And vice versa: couscous is known in the Middle East but it is not common (there is a simile in Palestine called maftul). When speaking of the Middle East, reference is made to Bahrain, Egypt, Iraq, Jordan, Kuwait, Lebanon, Oman, Palestine/Israel, Qatar, Saudi Arabia, Syria, United Arab Emirates, and Yemen.

It is also very typical in Turkish cuisine, where it is known as şehriyeli pilavı. Internationally, it can be found in some sources such as "Lebanese rice" or "Egyptian style rice". Essentially, all names refer to the same preparation.

Preparation 

The recipes vary slightly between them on how an Arabic rice should be prepared. Only one of them is shown here. Before use, the rice is rinsed under running water until the water runs clear. Then it is left to dry (although in some recipes it is left to soak, to remove excess starch). Formerly the rice was washed and dried because it could come with small stones or dust; Nowadays this step is no longer strictly necessary because in general it usually comes quite clean.

In the pan where the rice is going to be made, pour olive oil or clarified butter (or both) and toast the vermicelli in it. Being a fine pasta, in just a few minutes they will turn color, at which point the rice should be added immediately. If they are left for too long, it is easy for them to burn. The rice is stirred so that it becomes oily. This way it will not be sticky. At this time, salt is added and the desired spices as well.

A few minutes later, the water or chicken broth is added, at a ratio of 1:1, that is, the same liquid as rice. It is covered and when the water starts to boil, the heat is lowered. Depending on the altitude (amsl), the cooking time will vary between 15 and 30 minutes.

In case of using short grain, it is advisable to oil the rice again at the end of cooking, since it tends to cake more than a long grain.

See also 

 Middle Eastern cuisine
 Levantine cuisine
 Rice-A-Roni, Mass-produced version of the dish popular in North America
 Biryani, rice dish with lamb, eggs and dahi (curd).
 Kabsa, Arabic dish of rice, spices, vegetables and chicken.
 Kousa mahshi, Arabic dish of courgettes stuffed with rice.
 Mandi, Arabic dish of rice, lamb and Hawaiian spices.
 Mansaf, Arabic dish of rice, jameed and lamb.
 Maqluba, Arabic dish of rice, meat and vegetables.
 Mujaddara, Arabic dish of lentils, rice and onion.
 Quzi, Arabic dish of rice with lamb.
 Yabrak, Arabic dish of vine leaf stuffed with rice

References 

Arab cuisine
Christmas food
Rice dishes